Cormack may refer to:

 Cormack, Newfoundland and Labrador, a community in Canada
Cormack (surname), people with the surname Cormack

See also 
 McCormack
 Cormac